Sauveterre-de-Rouergue (literally Sauveterre of Rouergue) is a commune in the Aveyron department in southern France. It is one of the Les Plus Beaux Villages de France (most beautiful villages of France).

Population

See also
Communes of the Aveyron department

References

External links

 Sauveterre-de-Rouergue (in English)

Communes of Aveyron
Plus Beaux Villages de France
Aveyron communes articles needing translation from French Wikipedia